Austrian Brazilians (Portuguese: Austro-brasileiro, Austríaco brasileiro) refers to Brazilians of full, partial, or predominantly Austrian ancestry, or Austrian-born people residing in Brazil. Brazil is home to the second largest German-Austrian population outside their respective nations, after the United States. German is the second most spoken language in the country.
The author Stefan Zweig who wrote about Brazil, and the Habsburg-Lorraine Maria Leopoldina of Austria, Empress consort of Brazil, are among the most prominent Austrians to settle in Brazil.

Notable Austrian Brazilians

Jorge Mautner
Cláudio Heinrich
Juca Chaves
Fritz Köberle
Erwin Kräutler
Maria II of Portugal
Maria Leopoldina of Austria
Princess Francisca of Brazil
Otto Maria Carpeaux
Prince Pedro Luiz of Orléans-Braganza
Pedro II of Brazil
Pedro Neschling
Stefan Zweig
Xuxa
Adriano Laaber
Taís Araújo
Angélica Ksyvickis

See also
 Austria–Brazil relations
 Immigration to Brazil
 White Brazilians
 Austrian people
 German Brazilian

References

External links

Brazilians
 
Austrian Brazilian